Bobby Valentino may refer to:
 Bobby Valentino (American singer) (born Robert Wilson, 1980), now known as Bobby V
 Bobby Valentino (album), his 2005 debut album
 Bobby Valentino (British musician) (born James Beckingham), English violinist, songwriter and singer

See also
Bobby Valentín, Puerto Rican singer
Bobby Valentine, baseball player and manager